Yumu may refer to:
Yumu language (Australia)
Yumu language (Nigeria)